Robert Quennessen (17 February 1888 – 18 June 1940) was a French fencer. He competed in the individual épée event at the 1908 Summer Olympics.

References

External links
 

1888 births
1940 deaths
French male épée fencers
Olympic fencers of France
Fencers at the 1908 Summer Olympics